Clepsis gemina is a species of moth of the family Tortricidae. It is found in Darjeeling, India.

References

Moths described in 1979
Clepsis